Marla Lee Runyan (married name Lonergan; born January 4, 1969) is an American track and field athlete, road runner and marathon runner who is legally blind. She is a three-time national champion in the women's 5000 metres.

Early life and education
Runyan was born in Santa Maria, California. After graduating from Camarillo High School in 1987, she went on to study at San Diego State University, where she began competing in several sporting events: the heptathlon, 200-meter dash, high jump, shot put, 100-meter hurdles, long jump, javelin throw and the 800-meter run. In 1994 she received her master's degree in Education of Deafblind Children.

Career

1992 Summer Paralympics 
Runyan won four gold medals at the 1992 Summer Paralympics in the long jump and the 100, 200, and 400 meter races. She also competed in cycling at those games.

1996 Olympic trials and Paralympics
She attempted to qualify for the "Able Bodied" Olympics at the 1996 U. S. Olympic Trials, finishing 10th in the Heptathlon. While failing to qualify, she ran the 800 meters in 2:04.60, a heptathlon-800m American record. This success convinced her to try distance running. 

At the 1996 Paralympics in Atlanta, she took silver in the shot put and gold in the pentathlon.

1999 Pan American Games and 2000 Summer Olympics
Her career as a world-class runner in able-bodied events began in 1999 at the Pan American Games in Winnipeg, where she won Gold in the 1,500-meter race and was ranked second in the United States in that event in 1999 by Track and Field News. The next year, she placed eighth in the 1,500-meter in the 2000 Sydney Olympics, making Runyan the first legally blind athlete to compete in the Olympics and the highest finish by an American woman in that event.

Success at National Championships, release of autobiography
By 2001 she won her first of three consecutive 5000 metre National Championships. She also released her autobiography "No Finish Line: My Life As I See It"  In 2002, she added the road 5K and 10K National Championships, and married her coach, Matt Lonergan.

She finished as the top American at the 2002 New York Marathon with a time of 2 hours, 27 minutes and 10 seconds to post the second-fastest debut time ever by an American woman.

She won the road 5K again in 2003 and qualified for the 2004 Summer Olympic Games by finishing second in the United States Olympic Trials (track and field). She took 2005 off to give birth to her first child, Anna Lee on September 1, but returned to the roads in 2006 winning her second National Championship at 20 km (her first was in 2003).

Awards and recognition
She was the USATF "Runner of the Year" in 2002 and 2006.

World Records
, Runyan holds IPC World Records in the T13 classification for the 400 m, 800 m, 1500 m, 5000 m, High Jump, Long Jump and Pentathlon. However, her personal bests at 3000m, 10,000m, and the marathon were also World Records, but were never ratified by the IPC.  See marlarunyan.net, the Official Website of Marla Runyan.

See also
 List of athletes who have competed in the Paralympics and Olympics

References

 Marla Runyan biography provided by the USA Track & Field organization

External links
 
 
 
 Michals, Debra.  "Marla Runyan".  National Women's History Museum.  2015.
 
 

1969 births
Living people
People from Camarillo, California
Sportspeople from Santa Maria, California
Sportspeople from Ventura County, California
Track and field athletes from California
American female middle-distance runners
American female cyclists
Visually impaired middle-distance runners
Paralympic middle-distance runners
Olympic track and field athletes of the United States
Athletes (track and field) at the 2000 Summer Olympics
Athletes (track and field) at the 2004 Summer Olympics
Paralympic cyclists of the United States
Paralympic track and field athletes of the United States
Paralympic gold medalists for the United States
Paralympic silver medalists for the United States
Paralympic medalists in athletics (track and field)
Cyclists at the 1992 Summer Paralympics
Athletes (track and field) at the 1992 Summer Paralympics
Athletes (track and field) at the 1996 Summer Paralympics
Medalists at the 1992 Summer Paralympics
Medalists at the 1996 Summer Paralympics
Pan American Games medalists in athletics (track and field)
Pan American Games gold medalists for the United States
Athletes (track and field) at the 1999 Pan American Games
Athletes (track and field) at the 2003 Pan American Games
Medalists at the 1999 Pan American Games
American blind people
World record holders in Paralympic athletics
San Diego State Aztecs women's track and field athletes
Cyclists from California